Catte Adams is an American singer-songwriter who has toured or recorded with artists such as Bill Medley, Neil Young, Natalie Cole, and Chaka Khan, and appears on Yanni's live concert video, Tribute. She came to national prominence as the second season winner of Star Search, which led to appearances on The Tonight Show with Jay Leno and The Arsenio Hall Show. She has been the opening act for notable celebrities such as George Burns, Don Rickles, and Jay Leno.

External links

Official site
Interview with Catte Adams

American women singers
Living people
Year of birth missing (living people)
21st-century American women musicians